Walter Odede (born 11 November 1974) is a Kenyan footballer. He played in 16 matches for the Kenya national football team in 2002 and 2003. He was also named in Kenya's squad for the 2004 African Cup of Nations tournament.

References

1974 births
Living people
Kenyan footballers
Kenya international footballers
2004 African Cup of Nations players
Place of birth missing (living people)
Association football midfielders
Mathare United F.C. players
Bandari F.C. (Kenya) players